Smolník was a Ruthenian village in eastern Slovakia, within Snina District. The first mention of the village was in 1568. In 1980 the village was destroyed, along with six other villages, to make way for the Starina reservoir. Before its destruction, it had 72 houses and approximately 360 people. The village originally belonged to the noble families of Humenné, which was later given to some other noble families. There remains a cemetery of people killed during World War I and a bell tower. The territory is within Poloniny National Park.

Former villages in Slovakia
Stakčín